The chestnut-bellied seedeater (Sporophila castaneiventris) is a species of bird in the family Thraupidae.
It is found in Bolivia, Brazil, Colombia, Ecuador, French Guiana, Guyana, Peru, Suriname, and Venezuela.
Its natural habitats are subtropical or tropical moist shrubland and heavily degraded former forest.

References

chestnut-bellied seedeater
Birds of the Amazon Basin
Birds of the Guianas
chestnut-bellied seedeater
Taxonomy articles created by Polbot